Fanfares of Love is a 1951 West German comedy film directed by Kurt Hoffmann and starring Dieter Borsche, Georg Thomalla and Inge Egger. It is a remake of the 1935 French film Fanfare of Love. It was a major hit and in 1953 a sequel Fanfare of Marriage was released, showing the further adventures of the main characters.

Production
The story was based on a screenplay written by Robert Thoeren while working in the Weimar Republic in the early 1930s. After emigrating to Paris following the Nazi takeover of power, it was developed into a French film directed by Richard Pottier.

It was shot at the Bavaria Studios in Munich with sets designed by the art director Franz Bi. Location filming also took place at Berchtesgaden in the Bavarian Alps.

Hollywood remake
The film was later remade in Hollywood by Billy Wilder as Some Like it Hot. Thoeren screened the 1951 German film for Wilder, who secured the remake rights. In contrast to the contemporary setting of the German film, Wilder shifted the action back to the 1920s. He later tried to downplay the extent to which he was influenced by the original, describing it as "a very low budget, very third-class German picture".

In the German film synchronisation of Some Like It Hot, Georg Thomalla served as the voice for Jack Lemmon in his role as the second musician - exactly the role which Thomalla played eight years earlier in this film.

Synopsis
Two struggling male musicians, unable to get any work, disguise themselves as women in order to join a successful all-female band.

Cast
 Dieter Borsche as Hans Mertens
 Georg Thomalla as Peter
 Inge Egger as Gaby Bruck
 Grethe Weiser as Lydia d'Estée
 Oskar Sima as Hallinger
 Ilse Petri as Sabine
 Beppo Brem as Boxer
 Hans Fitz as Friedrich
 Ursula Traun as Anette
 Viktor Afritsch as Friseur
 Herbert Kroll as Poehle
 Michl Lang as Hotelportier Brunhuber
 Walther Kiaulehn as Oberkellner

References

Bibliography 
 Terri Ginsberg & Andrea Mensch. A Companion to German Cinema. John Wiley & Sons, 2012.

External links 
 
 Fanfaren der Liebe at filmportal.de/en

1951 films
1951 comedy films
German comedy films
West German films
1950s German-language films
Films directed by Kurt Hoffmann
Cross-dressing in film
Remakes of French films
German black-and-white films
1950s German films
Films shot at Bavaria Studios